Keren Subregion (Cheren Subregion) is a subregion in the northwestern Anseba region (Zoba Anseba) of Eritrea. Its capital lies at Keren (Cheren).

References

Subregions of Eritrea

Anseba Region
Subregions of Eritrea
Keren, Eritrea